The Dobra (in its upper course also: Bătrâna) is a left tributary of the river Mureș in Transylvania, Romania. It discharges into the Mureș in the village Dobra.

References

Rivers of Romania
Rivers of Hunedoara County